Angeleri is a surname. Notable people with the surname include:

Marcos Angeleri (born 1983), Argentine footballer
Stefano Angeleri (1926–2012), Italian footballer and manager